Kalovo is a village in the municipality of Trgovište, southeastern Serbia. According to the 2011 census, the village has a population of 23 people.

References

Populated places in Pčinja District